Septic Man is a 2013 horror film that was directed by Jesse Thomas Cook. The film had its world premiere at the Austin Fantastic Fest on September 19, 2013, where actor Jason David Brown won "Best Actor" in the Horror Features category. In the film Brown stars as a sewage worker who ends up transforming into a hideous mutant by way of toxic sewage.

Plot
Jack (Jason David Brown) is an average sewage worker who has been asked to investigate a water contamination in his hometown that has forced everyone else, including his pregnant wife Shelley (Molly Dunsworth), to evacuate. He decides to investigate the local sewage plant but ends up getting trapped in a septic tank by Lord Auch (Tim Burd) and his brother Giant (Robert Maillet). They refuse to let Jack out despite his pleas and the toxic sewage eventually begins to transform Jack into the hideous mutant Septic Man.

Cast
Jason David Brown as Jack / Septic Man
Molly Dunsworth as Shelley
Robert Maillet as Giant
Tim Burd as Lord Auch
Julian Richings as Phil Prosser
Stephen McHattie as Mayor
Nicole G. Leier as Woman
Kirill Belousov as Soldier

Reception
Ain't It Cool News and Dread Central both praised Septic Man, and Dread Central called it a "bizarre yet inventive film" and remarked that the film would not be for everyone's tastes. Fangoria and Complex both gave negative reviews overall, and Complex wrote that "It's a shame that Septic Man lacks the significance and social commentary of The Toxic Avenger, to which it's frequently compared, and settles for a straightforward plot to please fans of gag-inducing humor."

On review aggregator Rotten Tomatoes, the film holds an approval rating of 16% based on 19 reviews, with an average rating of 3.51/10. On Metacritic, the film has a weighted average score of 8 out of 100, based on seven critics, indicating "overwhelming dislike".

Awards
Best Actor, Horror Features Category at the Austin Fantastic Fest (2013, won - Jason David Brown)

References

External links
 

2013 horror films
2013 films
2010s English-language films